Robert "Bob" Greve (born 30 November 1934) is a former Australian rules footballer, who played in the Victorian Football League (VFL).

Greve played as a second rover in most games. He was a member of the losing Collingwood team against Melbourne in the 1956 Grand Final, and saw action as a reserve in Collingwood's successful grand final team in 1958.

References

External links

Australian rules footballers from Victoria (Australia)
Collingwood Football Club players
Collingwood Football Club Premiership players
Ivanhoe Amateurs Football Club players
1934 births
Living people
One-time VFL/AFL Premiership players